The Maťo (Matthew) was an 8-bit personal computer produced in the former Czechoslovakia by Štátny majetok Závadka š.p., Závadka nad Hronom, from 1989 to 1992. Their primary goal was to produce a personal computer as cheaply as possible, and therefore it was also sold as a self-assembly kit. It was basically a modified PMD 85, but without backward compatibility. This, combined with its late arrival to the market, made the MAŤO a commercial failure.

Specifications 
 MHB 8080A 2.048 MHz CPU
 48 KB RAM
 16 KB ROM 
 System monitor and built-in BASIC-G or simple games
 Tape recorder interface
 Monochromatic TV output
 288×256 resolution
 Built-in power supply

See also 

 PDM 85
 Tesla (Czechoslovak company)
 IQ 151
 Didaktik

References

External links 
 Old-computers.com - Mato
 Maťo (Czech)
 Emulator of PMD 85 and compatibles for Win32

Home computers
Science and technology in Czechoslovakia